Glee Glacier is a small glacier enclosed by the two arms of Dismal Ridge, flowing eastward to Roaring Valley, Antarctica. It was given this name by the New Zealand Victoria University of Wellington Antarctic Expedition, 1960–61; Glee is the wife of H. Richard Blank, an American member of the expedition. The team liked this name, ostensibly because of the feeling inspired by occasional sightings of the glacier made through the mists of Dismal Ridge, as it afforded a means of orientation in conditions of otherwise blind navigation.

References

Glaciers of Victoria Land
Scott Coast